"Believe in Love" is a song by Japanese dance music project Ravex, featuring South Korean singer BoA. On February 18, 2009, the original version of the song was simultaneously released with an acoustic version of the song, found on BoA's "Eien / Universe / Believe in Love" single.

Background and development 

Ravex was a three-person unit, consisting of dance musicians Shinichi Osawa, Tomoyuki Tanaka (otherwise known as Fantastic Plastic Machine) and Taku Takahashi of M-Flo, to celebrate the 20th anniversary of the Avex Group record label. The first single from this project was "I Rave U" (2008), featuring DJ Ozma.

BoA had collaborated with Osawa previously in 2002, on his single "Everything Needs Love" under the name Mondo Grosso, and had worked with Takahashi in 2004, when she appeared on M-Flo's single "The Love Bug".

The single features three songs: the B-side is a collaboration with Maki Goto, her first release under the Avex Trax label after parting with Hello! Project, as well as "Mega Ravex", a megamix of songs that would later appear of Ravex's debut album Trax.

BoA's acoustic version was backed by Brazilian guitarist Shigeharu Sasagao. This version was found on her "Eien / Universe / Believe in Love", and was added to her Best & USA compilation album a month later.

Critical reception 

CDJournal described the song as "a full-scale painful heart-string pulling song". For BoA's acoustic version, they noted that Sasagao's guitar accompaniment made the song into a "shining bossa-style ballad".

Track listings

Chart rankings

Sales

Release history

References 

2009 songs
2009 singles
Avex Trax singles
BoA songs
Japanese-language songs
Songs written by Shinichi Osawa
2000s ballads